Wil Cwac Cwac is a Welsh-language animated television series produced by Siriol Animation for S4C in 1982. It is based on a series of children's books written in the early 1930s by Jennie Thomas and J. O. Williams (including the famous Welsh-language book Llyfr Mawr y Plant; Welsh for Big Children's Book). Both book and television series take place in rural Wales. An English-language version of the show (called Will Quack Quack) was produced for the wider English-speaking market. The first 20 episodes were dubbed in UK English and aired on Children's ITV in 1984, with the remaining 10 following in 1986. In both versions, all narration and characters were voiced by Myfanwy Talog. A US English dub was also made, with Liza Ross narrating, and aired in the United States on The Disney Channel as a segment on the program Lunch Box.

Characters
Wil (Will) (duck, the protagonist and title character)
Martha (duck, Wil's mother)
Hwmffra (duck, Wil's father)
Percy (duck, Wil's cousin)
Mari Pickles (duck, Martha's friend)
Sioni (friend; chicken, he wears a blue and white striped pants, a light blue coat and white scarf.)
Huw (friend; goose, he wears a blue shirt and yellow pants with red suspenders.)
Dic (friend; duck, he wears a pink shirt and red polka-dot pants.)
Ifan (friend; turkey, he wears overalls and a green shirt.)
Doctor Parry (the town's doctor; ram)
Mr. Puw the Shop (grumpy shopkeeper; pig)
Mr. Owie Policeman (the town's policeman; goose)
Mr. Jones the School (the head teacher; goat)

Episodes
 Mr. Puw-the-Shop
 The Birthday
 Late for School!
 The Fishing Rod
 Football
 Atishoo!
 The Bike
 Hiccups
 Pepper!
 Pancakes
 The China Dog
 Whip and Top
 Coalhouse
 Whitewash
 Hwmffra's Letter
 Will, Sioni and the Bikes
 Clogs
 Doctor Parry
 Cousin Percy
 Thief
 Honey
 The Horseshoe
 The Mill Ness Monster
 Cops and Robbers
 Stuck in a Tree
 A Shower
 Will Goes Missing
 The Ring
 The Concert
 Hwmffra Has a Drink

References

1980s British children's television series
1982 British television series debuts
1982 British television series endings
British children's animated television shows
Disney Channel original programming
Animated television series about ducks
ITV children's television shows
Nick Jr. original programming
S4C original programming
Television shows based on children's books
Welsh television shows
Welsh-language television shows
English-language television shows
1980s Welsh television series
1980s British animated television series